Amandine Tissier (born 10 September 1993) is a French handball player who plays for Brest Bretagne Handball.

Achievements
EHF Challenge Cup:
Winner: 2012
Coupe de France:
Winner: 2016
Finalist: 2012

References

French female handball players
1993 births
Living people
People from Sablé-sur-Sarthe
Sportspeople from Sarthe